João Gil Zhu Zhang (born 17 November 1998), also known as Zhu Kangming in China and Hong Kong, is a Portuguese professional footballer of Chinese descent who currently plays as a defender for Hong Kong Premier League club Eastern.

Club career
Born in Portugal, Gil started his career with Benfica, before progressing through the academies of local teams, eventually signing for Cova da Piedade.

In August 2022, Gil signed for Hong Kong Premier League club Eastern.

Career statistics

Club

Notes

References

External links
 Zhu Kangming at the HKFA

1998 births
Living people
Portuguese footballers
Chinese footballers
Portuguese people of Chinese descent
Association football defenders
Hong Kong Premier League players
S.L. Benfica footballers
C.D. Cova da Piedade players
Eastern Sports Club footballers
Expatriate footballers in Hong Kong